Chen Qingchen (born 23 June 1997) is a Chinese badminton player. She started her achievements under her coach Li Yongbo, with partner in the women's doubles Jia Yifan, and in the mixed doubles Zheng Siwei. She ended the 2016 BWF Season by winning the BWF Most Promising Player of the Year, also completed her success by winning titles at the 2016 BWF Superseries Finals in the women's and mixed doubles categories respectively. In 2017, she was awarded as the BWF Best Female Player of the Year, after came to Dubai World Superseries Finals as the first seeded both in women's and mixed doubles, and also won the women's doubles gold and mixed doubles silver medals at the 2017 BWF World Championships in Glasgow, Scotland. In women's doubles, she also won gold medals at the 2021 and 2022 World Championships, 2018 Asian Games and at the 2019 Asian Championships.

Achievements

Olympic Games 
Women's doubles

BWF World Championships 
Women's doubles

Mixed doubles

Asian Games 
Women's doubles

Asian Championships 
Women's doubles

BWF World Junior Championships 
Girls' doubles

Mixed doubles

Asian Junior Championships 
Girls' doubles

Mixed doubles

BWF World Tour (12 titles, 6 runners-up) 
The BWF World Tour, which was announced on 19 March 2017 and implemented in 2018, is a series of elite badminton tournaments sanctioned by the Badminton World Federation (BWF). The BWF World Tour is divided into levels of World Tour Finals, Super 1000, Super 750, Super 500, Super 300, and the BWF Tour Super 100.

Women's doubles

BWF Superseries (12 titles, 7 runners-up) 
The BWF Superseries, which was launched on 14 December 2006 and implemented in 2007, was a series of elite badminton tournaments, sanctioned by the Badminton World Federation (BWF). BWF Superseries levels were Superseries and Superseries Premier. A season of Superseries consisted of twelve tournaments around the world that had been introduced since 2011. Successful players were invited to the Superseries Finals, which were held at the end of each year.

Women's doubles

Mixed doubles

 BWF Superseries Finals tournament
 BWF Superseries Premier tournament
 BWF Superseries tournament

BWF Grand Prix (13 titles, 3 runners-up) 
The BWF Grand Prix had two levels, the Grand Prix and Grand Prix Gold. It was a series of badminton tournaments sanctioned by the Badminton World Federation (BWF) and played between 2007 and 2017.

Women's doubles

Mixed doubles

 BWF Grand Prix Gold tournament
 BWF Grand Prix tournament

BWF International Challenge/Series (3 titles) 
Women's doubles

Mixed doubles

 BWF International Challenge tournament

Performance timeline

National team 
 Junior level

 Senior level

Individual competitions

Junior level 
Girls' doubles

Mixed doubles

Senior level

Women's doubles

Mixed doubles

References

External links 

1997 births
Living people
Hakka sportspeople
People from Xingning
Sportspeople from Meizhou
Badminton players from Guangdong
Chinese female badminton players
Badminton players at the 2020 Summer Olympics
Olympic badminton players of China
Olympic silver medalists for China
Olympic medalists in badminton
Medalists at the 2020 Summer Olympics
Badminton players at the 2018 Asian Games
Asian Games gold medalists for China
Asian Games silver medalists for China
Asian Games medalists in badminton
Medalists at the 2018 Asian Games
World No. 1 badminton players
BWF Best Female Player of the Year
21st-century Chinese women